The Gudongkou Dam is a concrete-face rock-fill dam on the Xiangxi River, a tributary of the Yangtze River, in Xingshan County of Hubei Province, China. The dam serves to provide for flood control and hydroelectric power generation. Preliminary construction (roads, bridges, foundation) started in 1990 but official construction on the dam and power station began on 1 March 1993. The dam began to impound its reservoir in 1996 and its three generators were commissioned between 1999 and 2000.

See also

List of dams and reservoirs in China
List of tallest dams in China

References

Dams in China
Concrete-face rock-fill dams
Dams completed in 1998
Energy infrastructure completed in 2000
Yichang
Hydroelectric power stations in Hubei